This page lists proposed railway stations in Scotland.

Proposed railway stations in Aberdeen and Aberdeenshire 

 Aberdeen Airport
 Aberdeen South
 Altens
 Bucksburn
Persley
Kittybrewster
Cove
Newtonhill
Peterhead
Fraserburgh
Westhill
Ellon

Proposed railway stations in Angus 

 Forfar

Proposed railway stations in Argyll & Bute 

 Faslane

Proposed railway stations in Clackmannanshire 

 Clackmannan
 Kincardine
 Longannet
 Cambus

Proposed railway stations in Dumfries and Galloway 

 Thornhill
 
 
 Dunragit/Glenruce
Cumnock
Mauchline
Ecclefechan

Proposed railway stations in Dundee 

 Craigie/West Ferry
 Dundee Airport
 Dundee West

Proposed railway stations in East Ayrshire 

 Altonhill
 Hurlford
 Kilmarnock Northwest
 Kilmarnock East
 Kilmarnock South

Proposed railway stations in East Dumbartonshire 

 Allander
 Westerhill
 Woodilee

Proposed railway stations in East Lothian 

 
 Blindwells
 Musselburgh P&R

Proposed railway stations in East Renfrewshire 

 Auchenback

Proposed railway stations in Edinburgh 

 Abbeyhill
Portobello
Piershill
Duddingston & Craigmillar
Newington
Blackford Hill
Morningside Road
Craiglockhart
Gorgie East

Proposed railway stations in Falkirk 

 Grangemouth
 Bonnybridge
 Bo'ness

Proposed railway stations in Fife 

 Halbeath
 Dysart
 Sinclairtown
Windygates
Kirkcaldy East
Wormit
Newburgh
St Andrews

As part of the Levenmouth Rail Link 

Leven

Proposed railway stations in Glasgow 

 Ibrox
 Finnieston
 West Street
Glasgow Cross
Citizens
Parkhead Forge
Millerston
Blochairn
Jordanhill West
Germiston
Drumchapel West

Proposed railway stations in the Highlands 
Beechwood
Culloden
Balloch (Highland)
Evanton
Halkirk

Proposed railway stations in Midlothian 

 Penicuik

Proposed railway stations in Moray 

 Kinloss

Proposed railway stations in North Ayrshire 

 Ardrossan North
 Largs Marina
 Drybridge

Proposed railway stations in North Lanarkshire 

 Plains
 Abronhill
 Ravenscraig
 Castlecary
 Mossend
 Crosshill

Proposed railway stations in Perth & Kinross 

 Abernethy
 Bridge of Earn
 Oudenarde
 Errol
 Greenloaning/Blackford

Proposed railway stations in Renfrewshire 

West Paisley
Erskine

Proposed railway stations in the Scottish Borders 

 Melrose

As part of an extension of the Borders Railway

Proposed railway stations in South Ayrshire 

 Ayr Hospital

Proposed railway stations in South Lanarkshire 

 Law
 Symington
 Burnbank
 Kirktonholme
 Bogleshole

Proposed railway stations in Stirling 

 Bannockburn

Proposed railway stations in West Lothian 

Broxburn

See also
List of proposed railway stations in England
List of proposed railway stations in Wales
Edinburgh Trams#Extension
Glasgow Subway#Future development

References

Railway stations in Scotland